Patrick K. O’Donnell is an American author of books on military history.

Career
O'Donnell's writing has appeared in publications as varied as The Daily Beast, Breitbart News, Military History Quarterly (MHQ), and World War II Magazine.

O'Donnell served as a consultant for the Medal of Honor game franchise.

In 2012, the OSS Society presented O'Donnell with the John Waller Award, which recognizes achievement in scholarship related to intelligence and special operations history. O'Donnell currently serves on its board of directors. O'Donnell's book We Were One was chosen for the Commandant's Professional Reading List and is required reading for Marines.

He received the Colby Circle Award for Outstanding Military History for Beyond Valour.

Washington's Immortals was selected as an Amazon Best Book of the Year So Far (History) and was named of the 100 Best American Revolution Books of All Time by the Journal of the American Revolution.

O’Donnell served as a research fellow at Mount Vernon's Fred W. Smith National Library.

Personal life
He is native of Westlake, Ohio, and attended American University for his undergraduate studies and Johns Hopkins for his graduate work.

Works
 Beyond Valor: World War II's Ranger and Airborne Veterans Reveal the Heart of Combat. Free Press, 2001.  
 Into the Rising Sun: In Their Own Words, World War II's Pacific Veterans Reveal the Heart of Combat. Free Press, 2002.  
 Operatives, Spies, and Saboteurs: the Unknown Story of the Men and Women of World War II's OSS. Free Press, 2004.  
 We Were One: Shoulder to Shoulder with the Marines Who Took Fallujah. Da Capo, 2007.  
 The Brenner Assignment: The Untold Story of the Daring Spy Mission of WWII. Da Capo, 2008.  
 They Dared Return: The True Story of Jewish Spies Behind the Line in Nazi Germany. Da Capo, 2009.  
 Give Me Tomorrow: The Korean War’s Greatest Untold Story – The Epic Stand of the Marines of George Company. Da Capo, 2010.  
 Dog Company: Boys of Pointe Du Hoc Rangers Who Landed at D-Day and Fought across Europe. Da Capo, 2012.  
 First SEALs: The Untold Story of the Forging of America's Most Elite Unit. DaCapo, 2014.  
 Washington's Immortals: The Untold Story of an Elite Regiment Who Changed the Course of the Revolution. Atlantic Monthly Press, 2016.  
 The Unknowns: The Untold Story of America’s Unknown Soldier and WWI’s Most Decorated Heroes Who Brought Him Home. Atlantic Monthly Press, 2018  
 The Indispensables: The Diverse Soldier-Mariners Who Shaped the Country, Formed the Navy, and Rowed Washington Across the Delaware Atlantic Monthly Press, 2021

References

External links
 http://www.patrickkodonnell.com
 Author Interview on Operatives, Spies and Saboteurs: The Unknown Story of the Men and Women of WWII's OSS on March 18, 2004, at the Pritzker Military Museum & Library
Author Interview  on The Unknowns: The Untold Story of America's Unknown Soldier and WWI's Most Decorated Heroes Who Brought Him Home on May 28, 2018, on NPR. 

21st-century American historians
21st-century American male writers
Living people
Year of birth missing (living people)
American male journalists
American male non-fiction writers